Belbury Poly is the studio band of Ghost Box Records co-founder Jim Jupp. Jupp is the main composer and producer and also plays synth, keyboards and guitar. Other members are session musicians, that have included: Christopher Budd on bass and lead guitar, Jim Musgrave on drums, James Allen on drums, David Sharp on acoustic guitar and Cate Brooks on piano.

Sound
Working with analogue electronics and wide range of unusual instrumentation and more recently supported by session players on drums and guitars, Belbury Poly's sound is characterised as a kind of upbeat, electronic and rustic prog rock. Influences, range from old library music and TV soundtracks to keyboard driven 1970s prog rock, folk and Krautock.

Jupp has spoken about Belbury Poly and the other artists on Ghost Box as sounding like the misremembered past of a parallel world, as well as acknowledging a debt to the author Arthur Machen. The name references the fictional town of Belbury, created by the author C.S. Lewis in his novel That Hideous Strength.

Biography
Jim Jupp has released EPs, singles and six albums on Ghost Box under the name of Belbury Poly, and has released a dark ambient album for the label under the moniker Eric Zann. He is also a member of The Belbury Circle along with Cate Brooks (of The Advisory Circle) and occasional collaborator, John Foxx In 2019 he co-wrote and produced the music and spoken word album Chanctonbury Rings with Justin Hopper and Sharron Kraus. He has recorded library tracks for KPM, BMG and Lo-Editions. He has remixed tracks for several artists including John Foxx and Bill Ryder-Jones (The Coral). The track "The Willows" taken from the first Belbury Poly album of the same name was reworked by Paul Weller as "Earth Beat" for his 2020 album On Sunset. The debut EP by Belbury Poly, Farmer’s Angle was included in an Electronic Sound magazine feature, A History of Electronic Music in 75 Records.

Discography

Albums and EPs

Singles

Album Appearances

Remixes

The Belbury Circle (Belbury Poly and The Advisory Circle) Discography

References

External links
Belbury Poly on Ghost Box
Quietus Interview with Julian House on Ghost Box
The Sunday Times article on contemporary electronic music, including Ghost Box and Belbury Poly
Interview with Jim Jupp by The Haunted Generation Blog

English electronic music groups
Ghost Box Music artists
Musical groups established in 2004